SCS Randjiet Boys is a Surinamese football club. They play their home games at the 3,500-capacity Dr. Ir. Franklin Essed Stadium in Paramaribo. They were relegated from the Hoofdklasse in 2012–13 and again relegated, from the Eerste Klasse, the following season.

References

Randjiet Boys